Biophysical chemistry is a physical science that uses the concepts of physics and physical chemistry for the study of biological systems. The most common feature of the research in this subject is to seek explanation of  the various phenomena in biological systems in terms of either the molecules that make up the system or the supra-molecular structure of these systems.

Techniques
Biophysical chemists employ various techniques used in physical chemistry to probe the structure of biological systems. These techniques include spectroscopic methods such as nuclear magnetic resonance (NMR) and other techniques like X-ray diffraction and cryo-electron microscopy. An example of research in biophysical chemistry includes the work for which the 2009 Nobel Prize in Chemistry was awarded. The prize was based on X-ray crystallographic studies of the ribosome that helped to unravel the physical basis of its biological function as a molecular machine that translates mRNA into polypeptides. Other areas in which biophysical chemists engage themselves are protein structure and the functional structure  of cell membranes. For example, enzyme action can be explained in terms of the shape of a pocket in the protein molecule that matches the shape of the substrate molecule or its modification due to binding of a metal ion. The structures of many large protein assemblies, such as ATP synthase, also exhibit machine-like dynamics as they act on their substrates. Similarly the structure and function of the biomembranes may be understood through the study of model supramolecular structures as liposomes or phospholipid vesicles of different compositions and sizes.

Institutes
The oldest reputed institute for biophysical chemistry is the Max Planck Institute for Biophysical Chemistry in Göttingen.

Journals
Biophysical chemistry journals include Biophysical Journal, Archives of Biochemistry and Biophysics (published by Academic Press), Biochemical and Biophysical Research Communications (Academic Press), Biochimica et Biophysica Acta (Elsevier Science), Biophysical Chemistry, An International Journal devoted to the Physics and Chemistry of Biological Phenomena (Elsevier), Journal of Biochemical and Biophysical Methods (Elsevier), Journal of Biochemistry, Biology and Biophysics (Taylor & Francis), and Journal de Chimie Physique, Physico-Chimie Biologique (EDP Sciences and the Société Française de Chimie).

See also
 Biophysical techniques
 Biophysics
 Biochemistry

References

Bibliography 

 
 

Chemistry
Biophysics